The 1958 Iowa Hawkeyes football team represented the University of Iowa in the 1958 Big Ten Conference football season.  The team was coached by Forest Evashevski and captained by fullback John Nocera.  The Football Writers Association of America (FWAA) awarded the team the Grantland Rice Award, which is presented annually to the college football team adjudged by the FWAA to be national champion.

Preseason
Prior to 1958, coach Forest Evashevski had compiled a 31–21–3 record in six seasons with the Hawkeyes.  His most successful years were the previous two, 1956 and 1957, in which Iowa went 16–2–1.  The 1956 team became the first to win the Big Ten Conference championship in 34 years, and their 1957 Rose Bowl victory over Oregon State was the first postseason trip and win in school history.  Both teams finished in the top ten in the final AP Poll.

Expectations for the 1958 season were high, despite the graduation of two star players.  Tackle Alex Karras, who won the 1957 Outland Trophy and was twice selected as an All-American, and end Jim Gibbons, an All-American in 1957, were both drafted by the Detroit Lions in the 1958 NFL Draft.  Senior quarterback Randy Duncan, who also started in 1957, would be relied on heavily to replace the lost talent.

Schedule

Roster

Rankings

Season

Texas Christian

Iowa's season opener against TCU was played under the shadow of a new press box, which would watch over nearly five decades of Hawkeye football.  Iowa beat the No. 6 Horned Frogs easily, 17-0.  The win shot the Hawkeyes up to No. 8 in the September 29 poll.  TCU, the eventual Southwest Conference champions, would finish in the top ten of the final poll with an 8-2-1 record.

Air Force

The Air Force Academy had only played two seasons of varsity football when they came to Iowa City on October 4.  The Falcons surprised the Hawkeyes with a 13-13 tie.  The draw dropped Iowa to No. 17 in the October 6 poll, but Evashevski later said, "If we had beaten the Air Force we never in the world would have won the Big Ten championship."  Air Force won their next nine games and tied TCU in the Cotton Bowl Classic to finish in the top ten of the final poll with a 9-0-2 record.

Indiana

Iowa recovered from the tie with Air Force by crushing usually weak Indiana in both teams' Big Ten opener, 34-13.  The victory was the Hawkeyes' sixth straight over the Hoosiers and Iowa rose to No. 13 in the October 13 poll.

at Wisconsin

Wisconsin was Iowa's first test in the Big Ten.  The No. 4 Badgers hosted the Hawkeyes on October 18.  Iowa had not won in Madison since 1946.  It was the second game in four weeks the Hawkeyes had played against a top ten team.  Iowa had little trouble with Wisconsin, winning by a score of 20-9, the Badgers' only Big Ten loss of the season.  The game would end up deciding the Big Ten championship, as Iowa finished 5-1 in the Big Ten and Wisconsin finished 5-1-1.  Having now defeated two top ten teams, Iowa jumped to No. 7 in the October 20 poll.

Northwestern

Iowa hosted No. 8 Northwestern on October 25, the third game in five weeks the Hawkeyes had played against a top ten team.  It was the first game between two top ten Big Ten teams of the season.  Iowa's homecoming game against the Wildcats was tighter than the Wisconsin game, but the Hawkeyes prevailed 26-20.  The highlight of the game was All-American end Curt Merz's one-handed touchdown catch.  The Hawkeyes' second victory over a top ten team in as many weeks earned them the No. 2 spot in the October 27 poll.  The next day, Iowa was ranked No. 1 by United Press International.  It was the first time the Hawkeyes had ever topped a national football poll.

at Michigan

Michigan was in the midst of its worst season in twenty-two years when undefeated Iowa came to town on November 1.  Michigan Stadium was only two-thirds full that day, and the Hawkeyes blew out the uninspired Wolverines.  All-Big Ten halfback Willie Fleming opened the scoring, running 72 yards for a touchdown on a punt return on the final play of the first quarter.  Halfback Ray Jauch, who led the nation in yards per carry in 1958, ran 74 yards for a touchdown early in the second quarter to put Iowa up 14-0.  Michigan also scored a touchdown in the second quarter, but Iowa led by eight points at halftime.  Michigan scored another touchdown and completed a two-point conversion to tie the game early in the third quarter.  Iowa responded with twenty-three unanswered points to win the game 37-14.  Bob Jeter had touchdown runs of 3 yards in the third quarter and 27 yards in the fourth quarter, the latter of which was followed by a two-point conversion pass from John Nocera to Curt Merz.  Fleming also ran 61 yards for a touchdown in the fourth quarter, which was followed by a two-point conversion pass from Randy Duncan to Merz.  The victory was Iowa's first over Michigan in thirty-four years, and Michigan alumnus Evashevski's first in six attempts.  Iowa remained No. 2 in the November 3 AP Poll and No. 1 in the November 4 UPI Poll.

at Minnesota

Iowa played their final road game of the season in Minneapolis on November 8.  Minnesota did not figure to be much of a challenge.  The Golden Gophers were 0-6 and had not won a football game in over a year.  The Hawkeyes did not disappoint, winning 28-6.  The victory clinched the Big Ten championship and a trip to the Rose Bowl for Iowa, whose Big Ten record remained perfect.  Iowa remained No. 2 in the November 10 AP Poll, but dropped to No. 2 in the November 11 UPI Poll.

Ohio State

    
    
    
    
    
    
    
    
    
    

Ohio State was the only team to beat Iowa in 1957, so the Hawkeyes had a chip on their shoulder when they hosted the No. 16 Buckeyes on November 15.  Despite their efforts, Iowa fell to Ohio State, 38-28.  It was again the Hawkeyes' only loss of the season, but this year they had already clinched the Big Ten championship.  Iowa sank to No. 6 in the November 17 and 18 polls.

Notre Dame

Iowa hosted No. 15 Notre Dame on November 22 in the Hawkeyes' final game of the regular season and the seniors' final game in Iowa Stadium.  Iowa defeated the Fighting Irish by a score of 31-21.  The Hawkeyes finished the season with a 7-1-1 record, as in 1957, but this year they would travel to Pasadena to play the Pacific Coast Conference champion California in the Rose Bowl.  Iowa rose to No. 4 and No. 2 in the penultimate AP and UPI Polls on November 24 and 25, respectively.

Postseason

vs. California (Rose Bowl)

The No. 2 Iowa Hawkeyes (7-1-1, 5-1 Big Ten) and the No. 16 California Golden Bears (7-3, 6-1 Pacific Coast) met in the forty-fifth Rose Bowl Game on January 1, 1959, in the Rose Bowl in Pasadena, California.  The Hawkeyes were favored by 18½ points.  Randy Duncan helped Iowa take a 14-0 lead with a touchdown run in the first quarter and a touchdown pass to Jeff Langston in the second quarter.  The Hawkeye backfield carried Iowa the rest of the way, as Willie Fleming ran for two touchdowns and Bob Jeter, the Rose Bowl Most Valuable Player, and Don Horn each ran for one touchdown.  Iowa attempted a Rose Bowl record three two-point conversions and failed on all three, while Bob Prescott made one of two extra points.  End Jack Hart scored all of California's twelve points, running for a touchdown in the third quarter and catching a touchdown in the fourth quarter, both of which were followed by failed two-point conversion attempts.  Iowa broke four Rose Bowl records: longest run (Jeter 81), team rushing yards (429), team total yards (516) and individual rushing yards (Jeter 194); and tied another Rose Bowl record set by Georgia in 1943: first downs (24).  The attendance was 98,297.

* Rose Bowl record

Awards

Iowa finished 8-1-1 overall and 5-1 in the Big Ten Conference in 1958.  The Hawkeyes won the 1958 Big Ten football championship and the 1959 Rose Bowl Game.  The Football Writers Association of America named Iowa the 1958 college football national champion by awarding the team the 1958 Grantland Rice Award. The Hawkeyes finished No. 2 in the final AP and UPI polls, which were released before the bowl games, behind LSU.

The final AP Poll ranking is the highest in school history.  Iowa also finished No. 2 in the final UPI Poll in 1960.  The Hawkeyes led the nation in total offense (405.9 yards per game), were ranked second in passing offense (170.0 yards per game), ninth in rushing offense (235.9 yards per game) and ninth in scoring offense (26.0 points per game).

Quarterback Randy Duncan was named the 1958 Big Ten Most Valuable Player and was selected to the 1958 All-Big Ten first team and the 1958 All-America first team (unanimous).  He finished second in the 1958 Heisman Trophy voting behind Pete Dawkins of Army.  In 1997 Duncan was inducted into the College Football Hall of Fame.  End Curt Merz was selected to the 1958 All-America first team.  Halfback Willie Fleming was selected to the 1958 All-Big Ten first team.  Thirty-four Iowa Hawkeyes, including Duncan, Merz and Fleming, won letters in 1958.

1959 NFL Draft

References

100+ Years of Iowa Football
Hawkeye Archives 
MacCambridge, M. (2005) ESPN College Football Encyclopedia. New York: ESPN Books. 
Maly, R. (2003) Tales from the Iowa Sidelines. Sports Publishing L.L.C. 
The Gazette (2006) Greatest Moments in Iowa Hawkeyes Football History. Chicago: Triumph Books. 

Iowa
Iowa Hawkeyes football seasons
College football national champions
Big Ten Conference football champion seasons
Rose Bowl champion seasons
Iowa Hawkeyes football